Dileep Agrawal is a Nepalese entrepreneur.  He is the founder and director of WorldLink, an Internet service providing company.

Agrawal takes an interest in environmental development activities including dealing with climate change.

Early life and education
Agrawal was born in the Gaur terai region of Nepal, the son of Professor Vishwanath Agrawal. He completed his schooling in Nepal and in 1992 was awarded a full scholarship at Bates College, Maine, United States, where he graduated in 1996.
He started an e-mail service in Nepal with his cousins as partners while he was in Nepal for a summer vacation, establishing WorldLink Communications Pvt. Ltd. in 1995, and then returned to the United States to complete his college education.
After completion of his college degree he returned to Nepal to continue his business career in a budding Internet business.

References

Nepalese businesspeople
People from Kathmandu
1973 births
Living people